Ctenostola is a genus of moths of the family Noctuidae.

Species
 Ctenostola sparganoides (Bang-Haas, 1927)

References
Natural History Museum Lepidoptera genus database
Ctenostola at funet

Hadeninae